Mannose-binding protein-associated serine protease are serine proteases involved in the complement system.

Types include:
 MASP1
 MASP2

See also
 mannan-binding lectin

References

Complement system